Bafarvan (also Romanized as Bafarvān, Bafervān, and Bofravan; also known as Bafravān-e Bozorg) is a village in Mokriyan-e Shomali Rural District, in the Central District of Miandoab County, West Azerbaijan Province, Iran. At the 2006 census, its population was 767, in 149 families.

References 

Populated places in Miandoab County